Héctor Belo Herrera (6 May 1905 – 1936) was a Uruguayan fencer. He competed in the individual and team sabre and épée events at the 1924 Summer Olympics.

References

External links
 

1905 births
1936 deaths
Uruguayan male épée fencers
Olympic fencers of Uruguay
Fencers at the 1924 Summer Olympics
Uruguayan male sabre fencers
Sportspeople from Montevideo